Nəcəfqulubəyli or Nəcəfqulubəli or Nadzhafkulubeyli or Nəcəfqulubəjli or Nadzhafkulibeyli or Nadzhafulibeyli may refer to:
Nəcəfqulubəyli, Aghjabadi, Azerbaijan
Nəcəfqulubəyli, Barda, Azerbaijan